Scano di Montiferro is a comune (municipality) in the Province of Oristano in the Italian region Sardinia, located about  northwest of Cagliari and about  north of Oristano.

Scano di Montiferro borders the following municipalities: Borore, Cuglieri, Flussio, Macomer, Sagama, Santu Lussurgiu, Sennariolo, Sindia.

History 
The municipality of Scano was populated since prehistoric times  as shown by the recoveries in its territory of Domus de Janas and Giant's graves the presence of numerous nuragic installations. In the Middle Ages the villa of Scano belonged to the curatoria of the Montiferro, in the giudicato of Torres; in 1259, with the death of the giudicessa Adelasia, the curatoria was attached to the giudicato of Arborea. In 1410 the villa passed to the Aragonese and in 1421 was included in the territories subjected to the Catalan Zatrillas family.

Geography
Built on the crater of an ancient volcano on basaltic rocks, its territory is spread on hills and valleys among which flow courses of water.

The highest mountain is "Sa Pattada", elevation .

Main sights
Nuraghe Nuracale and some other 50 nuraghe
Domus de janas
giants' graves

Gastronomy 

The typical dish is the timballa de arrosu, a timbale of rice with filled of meats and vegetables.

The cultivation of the olive trees and the grapevine offer a delicious oil and a very good wine.  The bread and the sweets (amaretos, tiricas, pabassinos, bread of saba) is manufactured still with handicraft methods.

Among the cheeses is the casizzolu of the montiferru, from the characteristic shape of pear, derived of the bovine milk and the "pilotu", the authentic cheese of Sardinian sheep.

Wildfire 2021

References

External links

 www.nuracale.it/
 www.scanomontiferro.it/

Cities and towns in Sardinia